Anton Powolny (born 29 August 1899) was an Austrian footballer who played as a striker. During his only season in Italy with Inter, he was the top scorer in the 1926–27 Divisione Nazionale season, with 22 goals in 27 appearances.

References

External links
  Profile at Inter Archive

1899 births
Austrian footballers
A.C. Reggiana 1919 players
Inter Milan players
Year of death unknown
Association football forwards